Aramane is a 2008 Indian Kannada drama film directed by Nagashekhar, starring Ganesh and Anant Nag in the lead roles. The plot of the film revolves around a wealthy businessman who is left isolated in his palatial house by his children after he decides to remarry on his wife's passing. He is befriended by a photographer who assures of bringing them together for 'one last photo' of the entire family.

The film's music was composed by Gurukiran.

Plot
Arun is a photographer employed in a studio in Mysore. Also living in the city is a very wealthy Rajashekhara Aras, in his palatial house, now a loner separated from his family, and has become a hard drinker, living with his manservant Basava. Arun is called one day to Aras' house to get his photo clicked for an official document. They befriend over a drink when Aras reveals to Arun of his children have left him when they learn of his decision to remarry on his wife's passing, twenty-two years ago. He wishes of getting a photo clicked with his family one last time and pleads Arun to unite him with his three children who are now living Sydney, Bangalore, and Washington, D.C. Arun, initially reluctant, sees his distress and assures.

On learning that the husband of Aras' eldest daughter is a Police commissioner in Bangalore, he acquires their residential address and befriends the couple's younger daughter Neethu. She is shocked by his revealing of her grandfather's existence, who had always thought that he was dead as told by her parents.
Then Neetu arranges for flight tickets for Arun to visit Sydney relatives. In Sydney Arun loses his focus and starts roaming the streets with a mangalasutra in his hands searching for Aisu from Cheluvina Chittara. 
He meets Aisu who is now married to Neetu's Uncle in Sydney. In a fit of rage Arun kills Aisu and steals her passport and her credit card. Using the card he undergoes gender altering process , thereby resembling Aisu.
Using her passport he goes to Washington DC to search for the other Uncle of Neetu. But a shock awaits him there, he finds Nandini from Mungaru male(after divorcing Diganth) hanging out with the American Uncle of Neetu.
Reality strikes Arun hard and out of a dejected feeling he just auditions for a randomn role in a Quentin Tarantino's upcoming movie. He lands the role and starts looking at life in a much happier and beautiful shade. The movie goes on to become a Blockbuster earning Arun accolades from everyone.
He adopts his screen name as Arushi(due to gender alter operation) and finally is approached by Kevin Feige for a standalone film in the Marvel Universe.
But instead Arun convinces Kevin Feige for a Mungaru male remake in hollywood titled Devdas and ultimately quotes $30 million as a fixed fee.
In the end credits we see that Arun has become famous in India for his Hollywood redemption. Amidst the Chaos we see Rajasekhara Aras and his family trying to get hold of Arun for killing Aisu hence revealing that the story will have a sequel titled "Bachlumane"!!

Cast

 Ganesh as Arun/Arushi
 Anant Nag as Rajashekhara Aras
 Roma as Geetha
 Tara as Savitri
 Tejaswini Prakash as Neetha
 Karibasavaiah as Basava
 Avinash as Police commissioner Prakash
 Vijayasarathi
 Santhosh Aryan as Quentin Tarantino
 Ganesh Rao as Kevin Feige
 Kashi
 Mithra
 Sri
 Dr. Nagesh
 Rekha Kumar
 Sumithra as Lakshmi in a cameo appearance
 Gurukiran in special appearance in song "Kolle Nannanne"
 Vasudha Bharighat in a cameo appearance

Box office
The film received positive reviews from both critics and the audience and was declared a "super hit" by completing 100 days.

Soundtrack

Gurukiran composed the film score and the soundtrack, lyrics for which was penned by Kaviraj, Yogaraj Bhat, Jayant Kaikini and V. Nagendra Prasad. The soundtrack album consists of six tracks. It was released on 22 March 2008 in Bangalore, and was distributed into the market by Skanda Audio.

Home media
The movie was released on DVD with 5.1 channel surround sound and English subtitles and VCD.

References

External links
 

2000s Kannada-language films
2008 films
Films scored by Gurukiran